The office of Groom in Waiting (sometimes hyphenated as Groom-in-Waiting) was a post in the Royal Household of the United Kingdom, which in earlier times was usually held by more than one person at a time – in the late Middle Ages there might be dozens of persons with the rank, though the Esquires and Knights of the Body were more an important and select group. Grooms-in-Waiting to other members of the Royal Family and Extra Grooms in Waiting were also sometimes appointed.  For the general history of court valets or grooms see Valet de chambre.

From the time of the Restoration (1660), the king was attended by Grooms of the Bedchamber, whose functions as attendants on the monarch's person were performed in the reign of Queen Anne by Women of the Bedchamber. By the time of Queen Victoria, however, the majority of political offices no longer involving regular attendance on the sovereign, there were appointed, in addition to the Queen's Women of the Bedchamber, eight Grooms in Waiting who would discharge those political and social functions of the Grooms of the Bedchamber which could not be undertaken by the Queen's attendants of the female sex. After Queen Victoria's reign, the nomenclature of "Grooms in Waiting" was retained in preference to "Grooms of the Bedchamber".

One of the holders of the office was designated the Parliamentary Groom in Waiting from about 1859, when it became customary to appoint a Member of Parliament who was a supporter of the government of the day. In addition to his political functions, the Parliamentary Groom in Waiting was in attendance on the Queen with the other grooms. The office became vacant in 1891, when Lord Burghley was promoted to the similar political office of Vice-Chamberlain of the Household. The political office fell into disuse in 1892, since which time it has not been revived, although this did not affect the non-political, court position of Groom in Waiting.

List of Parliamentary Grooms in Waiting 

1859 Robert Nigel Fitzhardinge Kingscote (Liberal-West Gloucestershire)
1866 Hon. Charles Hugh Lindsay (Conservative-Abingdon)
1869 Algernon Fulke Greville (Liberal-Westmeath)
1874 Donald Cameron (of Lochiel) (Conservative-Inverness-shire)
1880 William Carington (Liberal-Wycombe)
1883 William Henry Grenfell (Liberal-not MP at the time)
1883 Sir Gerard Smith (Liberal-Wycombe)
1885 Sir Henry Aubrey-Fletcher, Bt (Conservative-Lewes)
1886 Hon. Charles Robert Spencer (Liberal-Mid Northamptonshire)
1886 Lord Burghley (Conservative-North Northamptonshire)
1891 office vacant
1892 office abolished

List of all Grooms in Waiting

Victoria (1837–1901 )

In Ordinary

Extra

17 July 1837–18 December 1842 General Sir Frederick Wetherall
7 November 1842–15 December 1850 General The Hon. Sir William Lumley
31 December 1844–3 June 1895 The Hon. Charles Augustus Murray
24 September 1859–3 May 1860 Lieutenant-General Berkeley Drummond
28 March 1860–16 August 1865 General Sir Frederick Stovin
1 April 1861–26 December 1861 Colonel Lord James Murray
26 December 1861–1 June 1867 Colonel Francis Seymour
30 July 1866–22 January 1901 Lieutenant Walter George Stirling
24 February 1876–10 July 1890 Lieutenant-General Francis Seymour
21 December 1877–11 March 1881 Lieutenant Colonel William Cavendish
23 October 1878–22 March 1880 Captain Fleetwood Edwards
29 December 1882–14 December 1888 Colonel The Hon. George Liddell
13 April 1884–30 June 1884 The Hon. Alexander Grantham Yorke
15 March 1888–22 January 1901 Major-General Thomas Dennehy
23 June 1891–31 December 1891 Admiral Sir John Edmund Commerell
31 December 1891–15 January 1896 Admiral Lord Frederick Kerr
16 December 1895–22 January 1901 General Sir Michael Biddulph

Edward VII (1901–1910)

In Ordinary

Extra

23 July 1901–6 May 1910 The Hon. Alexander Grantham Yorke
23 July 1901–6 May 1910 Major-General Sir Thomas Dennehy
23 July 1901–1 April 1909 Sir Maurice Holzmann
23 July 1901–23 July 1905 General Sir Michael Biddulph
23 October 1905–6 May 1910 Admiral Sir John Fullerton
25 June 1909–6 May 1910 Sir Donald Mackenzie Wallace

George V (1910–1936)

In Ordinary

Extra

10 June 1910–10 January 1919 Sir Donald Mackenzie Wallace
10 June 1910–29 June 1918 Admiral Sir John Fullerton
14 April 1916–17 April 1919 Sir Walter Campbell
1 May 1924–20 January 1936 The Hon. Montague Eliot
9 June 1931–20 January 1936 Sir Harry Lloyd Verney

Edward VIII (1936)

In Ordinary

No ordinary grooms-in-waiting were appointed to attend Edward VIII during his reign as King-Emperor.

Extra

21 July 1936–11 December 1936 The Hon. Montague Eliot
21 July 1936–11 December 1936 Sir Harry Lloyd Verney
21 July 1936–11 December 1936 The Hon. Sir Harry Stonor
21 July 1936–11 December 1936 Major Sir Philip Hunloke
21 July 1936–11 December 1936 Colonel Sir Victor Mackenzie, Bart.

George VI (1936–1952)

In Ordinary

2 March 1937–11 December 1945 Rear-Admiral Sir Basil Vernon Brooke
2 March 1937–3 August 1937 Commander Sir Harold George Campbell
2 March 1937–6 February 1952 Arthur Horace Penn, Esq.
2 March 1937–30 January 1942 Colonel The Hon. Sir George Sidney Herbert, Bart.
3 August 1937–6 February 1952 Captain Richard John Streatfeild (in the room of Commander Sir Harold George Campbell) 
3 August 1937–6 February 1952 Brigadier-General George Paynter

Extra

2 March 1937–6 February 1952 The Hon. Montague Eliot
2 March1937–28 February 1950 Sir Harry Lloyd Verney
2 March 1937–5 May 1939 The Hon. Sir Harry Stonor
2 March 1937–1 April 1947 Major Sir Philip Hunloke
2 March 1937–18 April 1944 Colonel Sir Victor Mackenzie, Bart.
3 August 1937–27 November 1951 Sir Frank Mitchell

Elizabeth II (1952–2022 )

In Ordinary

5 August 1952–30 December 1960 Sir Arthur Horace Penn

Extra

5 August 1952–19 September 1960 The Rt Hon. The Earl of St Germans

References

Database of Court Officers
 The Constitutional Year Book 1900 (William Blackstone & Sons 1900)
 Who's Who of British Members of Parliament: Volume I 1832–1885, edited by M. Stenton (The Harvester Press 1976)

Positions within the British Royal Household
Gendered occupations